Carlos Olivares Zepeda (born 22 May 1952) is a Chilean politician and physician who served as deputy.

References

External links
BCN Profile

1952 births
Living people
Chilean physicians
20th-century Chilean lawyers
University of Concepción alumni
Christian Democratic Party (Chile) politicians
Independent Regionalist Party politicians